Ala al-Din Eretna (or Eretne, also Artanā) was a Mongol officer of Uyghur origin in the service of Timurtash, the Ilkhanid governor of Anatolia. He later became the last Mongol governor of Anatolia himself and forged his own principality and dynasty, the Eretnids.

Background 
The name of Eretna may be derived from  through . He was born to Taiju Bakhshi (changed his name to Ja'far after conversion), a trusted bakhshi of Abaqa and his wife Tükälti. His elder brother was Emir Taramtaz, who persuaded Öljaitü to convert to Shiism, was executed by Abu Sa'id along with his brother Sanktâz for joining the rebellion of Irinjin in 1319. His niece was married to a son of Sa'd al-Din Savaji, vizier of Öljaitü. His sister was married to Timurtash.

Under Timurtash 
Apparently Eretna didn't join to revolt of 1319 and became a loyal follower of Timurtash, new viceroy in Anatolia. He led an army against Nasir-ud Din Ahmed of Sahib Ataids in August 1327. However, he was recalled by Timurtash upon learning of his brother Demasq Kaja's execution on 24 August. Eretna became acting viceroy on 22 December 1327 when Timurtash left for Mameluk Egypt. However fearing punishment, Ertene fled to Ibrahim I of Karaman. Timurtash was replaced by Amir Muhammad from Oirat tribe, an uncle of Abu Sa'id. He probably later travelled to Abu Sa'id's court in 1328.

Under Hasan Buzurg 
He rose to prominence again under Jalayirid viceroy of Anatolia, Hasan Buzurg, who became governor in 1332. He effectively became viceroy after Hasan Buzurg departed for Azerbaijan to crown his puppet Muhammad Khan in 1336. However, Hassan Kuchak established supremacy in Ilkhanid domains quickly in 1338, which forced Eretna to seek alliance with Mamelukes to seek protection. This protection was granted but it was nominal and short-lived, which prompted the Sultan to authorize raids on his lands. First such raid came from Turcoman chief Zeyneddin Karaca Bey who captured Darende to establish Beylik of Dulkadir. Karaca bey captured some territory from Aleppo viceroyalty of Egypt as well, which caused governor Amir Tashtamur to flee to Eretna in 1339-1340.

While nominally allied to Mamelukes, he came under attack of Chupanid force sent by Hasan Kuchak and led by Suleiman Khan himself. Chobanids took Erzurum, Erzinjan and Shebinkarahisar. Sides clashed near Karayün in Autumn 1343 in which Eretna was victorious. Assassination of Hasan few days later was a relief as well.

Reign 
After victory on Chobanids, Eretna declared his independence and took the title of sultan with the name Alaaddin. He moved the capital from Sivas to Kayseri, establishing dominance over important Anatolian towns of Nigde, Ankara, Amasya, Tokat, Samsun, Erzincan, Aksaray, Develi, Şebin-Karahisar and Merzifon. Later in 1344 Sati Beg, Tuda'un (son of Shaikh Mahmoud) and Surgan fled to Eretna's court. Latter urged him to attack Jalayirid domains, to which Eretna refused. Surgan nevertheless left for campaign and executed by Jalayirids. Internal disputes kept Malek Ashraf off the map while Eretna was in warm relations with Jalayirds and Mamelukes. He aided Umur Pasha during his siege of Smyrna in 1348, providing two trebuchet experts.

Eretna attacked Karamanids in 1350 and possibly killed Ahmet of Karaman and took Konya. He died two years later and buried in Köşk Medrese, Kayseri.

Family 
He was married with three wives and several offsprings:

 Toga Khatun — was from Jalairs and a relative of Hasan Buzurg
 Hassan — governor of Sivas, d. 1347, buried in Güdük Minare, Kayseri
 Jafar (r. 1354-1355)
 Isfahan Khatun
 Giyath al-Din Muhammad (r. 1355-1362)
 Suli Pasha (d. 1339)

Legacy 
According to Ibn Battuta, Eretna was a religious, benevolent, fair and scholarly ruler, spoke Arabic fairly well, as well as being an experienced soldier and statesman, gained fame among the people with the nickname "The Scanty Beard Prophet" due to these features and his sparse beard. He built Köşk Medrese mausoleum in Kayseri for his wife Suli Pasha and Güdük Minare for his son Hassan who died in 1347.

In Popular Media 

 He was portrayed by Muhittin Korkmaz in the movie Killing the Shadows (2006)

References

Sources 

 

1350 deaths
14th-century rulers in Asia
Mongol Empire Muslims
Ilkhanate
14th-century Turkic people
Uyghurs